Henry Theodore Sidney Gedge was a Scottish rugby union player. He also played for Oxford University, London Scottish FC, Rugby and Edinburgh Wanderers.

Early life
Henry Gedge was born on 19 August 1870 in London. He attended Dulwich College.

Rugby union career
Gedge made his international debut on 3 February 1894 at Newport in the Wales vs Scotland match. Of the 6 matches he played for his national side he was on the winning side on 4 occasions. He played his final match for Scotland on 11 March 1899 at Blackheath in the England vs Scotland match.

Personal life and family
He was the father of Peter Gedge, who was also capped for Scotland.

References

 Bath, Richard (ed.) The Scotland Rugby Miscellany (Vision Sports Publishing Ltd, 2007 )

1870 births
1943 deaths
London Scottish F.C. players
People educated at Dulwich College
Rugby union players from London
Rugby union wings
Scotland international rugby union players
Scottish rugby union players